Sir James Andrews, 1st Baronet, PC (NI) (3 January 1877 – 18 February 1951) was Lord Chief Justice of Northern Ireland and brother of Prime Minister J. M. Andrews and Thomas Andrews, builder of the Titanic.

Early life
Andrews was born in Comber, County Down, the third son of Thomas Andrews, flax spinner, of Ardara, Comber, and his wife, Eliza, daughter of James Alexander Pirrie and Eliza Swan and sister of William Pirrie, 1st Viscount Pirrie. He was a great-grandson of the United Irishman leader William Drennan. He was educated at the Royal Belfast Academical Institution, and then at Stephen's Green School, Dublin. At Trinity College Dublin, he had a distinguished career: he became a senior exhibitioner (1897) and a prizeman in civil and international law (1898), and graduated in 1899 with honours in ethics and logic. He was also gold medallist and auditor of the College Historical Society. A sports fan Andrews had passions for shooting, golf, cricket and sailing (mainly on Strangford Lough).

In 1922 Andrews married Jane Lawson  Ormrod (d. 1964), daughter of Joseph Ormrod, of Bolton, and widow of Captain Cyril Gerald Haselden RE. From her first marriage Jane had three children, Alexander Gerrard Haselden, Mick Haselden and Joyce Haselden.

Career
Although he came from a family of industrialists Andrews chose to read law (his uncle, William Drennan Andrews, had been a barrister and Judge of the High Court of Justice in Ireland). In 1900 he was called to the Bar of Ireland following graduation from the King's Inns.

He built up a lucrative practice and soon established himself as an advocate; his uncle William the judge did everything he could to further his career. In 1918 Andrews took silk, becoming a King's Counsel (KC); in 1920 he was elected a bencher of King's Inns; and in 1921 he was appointed a Lord Justice of Appeal in the new Supreme Court of Northern Ireland, established under the Government of Ireland Act 1920. The barrister and memoirist Maurice Healy, who admired both James and his uncle William, thought that on balance James was the better judge, as he did not have his uncle's fondness for handing down prison sentences of exceptional severity.

In 1924 he became a member of the Privy Council of Northern Ireland and in 1926 a bencher at the Inn of Court of Northern Ireland. He sat on the senate of the Queen's University of Belfast and on many of its committees from 1924 and he was a pro-chancellor from 1929.

In 1937 he succeeded Sir William Moore, 1st Baronet as Lord Chief Justice, an office which he held until his death. In 1938 an honorary LLD from his old university and, on 6 July 1942, he was created a baronet of Comber in the County of Down.

He died in Comber in 1951, his estate valued at £40,142 1s. 3d. in England; Northern Irish probate sealed in England, 30 June 1951. The baronetcy died with him.

The School of Law at Queen's University of Belfast named its building on University Square Sir James Andrews House in his honour.

References

	

1877 births
1951 deaths
Auditors of the College Historical Society
Members of the Privy Council of Northern Ireland
Alumni of Trinity College Dublin
Baronets in the Baronetage of the United Kingdom
Irish barristers
People educated at the Royal Belfast Academical Institution
People associated with Queen's University Belfast
People from Comber
Ulster Scots people
Lord chief justices of Northern Ireland
Lords Justice of Appeal of Northern Ireland
Alumni of King's Inns